Traditional Korean roof construction has traditionally used many kinds of natural materials. They are made of neowa (shingle), giwa (tiles), byeotjib (rice Straw), stone giwa (tiles), eoksae (eulalia) and goolpy (oak bark)

Neowa (Shingle) roof

Neowajib (a shingle-roofed house) can be seen in  mountain villages (for example, in Gangwon-do), since these are places which are hard to get materials, such as Giwa and rice straw. Instead, it is made with the pieces of thick bark of about 200-year-old red pine trees which are easy to get. The size of neowa is not fixed, but it is usually about 20–30 cm wide, 40–59 cm long and 4–5 cm thickness. Usually 105–140 of neowa used to complete a roof. To protect neowa from the wind, heavy stones or logs were put on the roof. The air can be changed through the gaps between neowa, since there was no smokestack. When it rains, the wood with moisture can have a waterproof effect. In common, neowa's durability is around 5 years. However, it is not true that all of neowa changed at the same time. If there's rotten one it was replaced by new one. Neowajib has rooms, a kitchen and a cow shed under one square roof, to protect domestic animals from mountain beasts, and to keep warm in winter. As red pine trees disappear, neowajib disappear gradually. Finally there are only 3 neowajib in Korea.

Giwa (Tile)

Giwa is a construction material for put roofing. It is also called gaewa. One of the basic forms of giwa is amkiwa (flat giwa) and sukiwa (round giwa); one giwa can be made by putting together two of these. Roofs are generally made by this way. Clay is kneaded and is spread thinly. Then amkiwa is extended upward and downward, and sukiwa cover joints at right and left side. By classifying giwa through materials, there are togiwa made by kneading and baking clay, cement giwa-made by mixing cement and sand, and metal giwa made by cutting and making form with metal plate. There were stone giwa and bronze giwa at the ruins of Rome, and marble giwa was used at Greek temples. In addition, there are cheonggiwa, ozigiwa, etc. glazing by various kinds of glaze. As a matter of form, we call original giwa bongiwa and Japanese giwa "geolchimgiwa". There are giwa in many countries.

Byeotjib (Rice Straw) roof
Chogajiboong (a straw roof) is made with byeotjib (rice straw), eulalia or reed, but generally made with byeotjib. Byeotjib protects residents from the sun in summer and keeps them warm in winter, because it is empty inside. Moreover, rain falls down well and hardly soaks through a roof because it has a relatively smooth surface. So, a thick roof is not needed. Warm and soft feeling is given by chogajiboong, because of the original properties of byeotjib. It is put over another byeotjib every year, and it shows clean and new feature without any special effort. The gentle roof is used like a farm for drying crops like red pepper and planting pumpkins or gourds.

Stone Giwa (Tile) roof
Flat layered stone roofs are called argillite (germpanam), on the roof in the much coal produced area; it takes a role of giwa. Giwa is formed in this way. Bluestone (cheongseok) is so smooth as to control raindrops gently. Its system is not different from giwa's. The bluestone is put at the bottom, and then largely different bluestone is put on it. By this way the process is continued. It can endure for a long time. These roofs can be seen commonly in the argillite zone. But it was possible to put this roof only for certain social classes because of the difficulty of purchasing and transporting the materials. Nowadays it can be seen at some areas of Gyeonggi-do and Gangwon-do.

Eoksae (Eulalia) roof
Korea has ten kinds of eulalia. The eulalia leaf is good for waterproofing and durability. It is a strong material that will last for ten years after covering the roof with eulalia once. The straw rope twisted with eulalia is not only strong and elastic but also good for waterproofing. It is used in weaving rain-gear (rainwear) or straw sandals. The material should be dried with dew for a week. Then it is put in a shady pot for good airing.

Goolpy (Oak Bark) roof
This is a kind of roof material used usually in mountain villages. The oak bark is over 20 years old. At first, the oak bark is peeled at the time of Chuseo (one of the 24 seasonal divisions, about August 23). Next it is put into water. After that, it is dried and a heavy stone is placed on it to flatten it. Bark made this way is commonly about 1.3 meters wide. If the air gets dry, the bark shrinks and obtains many holes. However, if it rains or its humidity is increased, holes get smaller and smaller. At last they disappear quickly. The stone between the joint is not to blow the bark. The life of the oak bark is so long that there is a saying, "Giwa exists for ten thousand years, and the Oak Bark for one thousand years."

References

Architecture in Korea
Roofs
Timber framing
Roof tiles